Chachacomayoc (possibly from Quechua  chachakuma a medical plant, "the one with the chachakuma plant) is a mountain in the Vilcanota mountain range in the Andes of Peru, about  high. It is situated in the Cusco Region, Canchis Province, Pitumarca District, and in the Quispicanchi Province, Cusipata District. Chachacomayoc lies southwest of  Huasacocha, Jatunrritioc and Yaritani and west of Allcamarina.

References

Mountains of Peru
Mountains of Cusco Region